Alexander Creighton Arthur was a 19th-century Member of Parliament from the Gisborne Region of New Zealand.

He represented the East Coast electorate from December 1889 to 1890, when he was defeated.

References

New Zealand MPs for North Island electorates
Members of the New Zealand House of Representatives
Unsuccessful candidates in the 1890 New Zealand general election